Natyrbovo is a rural locality (a selo) and the administrative center of Natyrbovskoye Rural Settlement of Koshekhablsky District, Adygea, Russia. The population was 3097 as of 2018. There are 26 streets.

Geography 
The village is located on the left bank of the Laba River, 23 km south of Koshekhabl (the district's administrative centre) by road. Rodnikovskaya is the nearest rural locality.

References 

Rural localities in Koshekhablsky District